Rama Nand is an Indian politician and leader of Communist Party of India (CPI). He represented  Alwar constituency from 1962 to 1977.

References

Communist Party of India politicians from Rajasthan
 Rajasthan MLAs 1962–1967
 Rajasthan MLAs 1967–1972
 Rajasthan MLAs 1972–1977
Date of death unknown
Year of birth unknown